Alexandros Bracjani (born 6 July 1992) is an Albanian professional footballer who plays as a forward for Greek Super League 2 club Makedonikos. He also holds a Greek passport.

Club career
Bracjani started his career with local Kavala amateur outfit Iraklis Kavala, before being acquired by the city's more prestigious AO Kavala, where he featured in the Superleague U−20 League, finishing as top-scorer for the club's U−20 squad. He was promoted to the men's squad in January 2011, signing his first professional contract with club, but received no caps in the Greek Superleague. He was thus loaned out to Cretan club AO Chania, playing in the Gamma Ethniki during the winter transfer window of the 2011–2012 season, where he had 17 caps and scored 3 goals. Bracjani also received Greek citizenship during his time in Chania. He returned to Kavala in the summer of 2012, featuring in a total 33 matches (28 for the Greek Football League and 5 for the Greek Football Cup) but scoring no goals. During the summer of 2013, Bracjani moved to another Gamma Ethniki outfit, Vyzantio Kokkinochoma for six months, finishing the 2013–2014 season with Football League side Episkopi.

Bracjani returned to his former club Kavala and the Gamma Ethniki in 2014, after a brief spell with Episkopi in the Football League. He, and teammate Christos Batzios refused to sign a new contract with the club during the winter transfer window of the 2016–17 Gamma Ethniki season and subsequently signed with Cretan club Ergotelis in January 2017. He won the Gamma Ethniki Group 4 championship with Ergotelis, and was subsequently waived in July. 

In August 2017, Bracjani signed with Cypriot Second Division club PAEEK.

Honours
Ergotelis
 Gamma Ethniki: 2016–17

External links

References

1992 births
Living people
Association football forwards
Albanian footballers
Kavala F.C. players
AO Chania F.C. players
Episkopi F.C. players
Ergotelis F.C. players
PAEEK players
ASIL Lysi players
Digenis Akritas Morphou FC players
Makedonikos F.C. players
Delta Ethniki players
Gamma Ethniki players
Football League (Greece) players
Cypriot Second Division players
Super League Greece 2 players
Albanian expatriate footballers
Expatriate footballers in Greece
Albanian expatriate sportspeople in Greece
Expatriate footballers in Cyprus
Albanian expatriate sportspeople in Cyprus